Ali Darzi (also Romanized as ‘Alī Darzī) is a village in Aq Kahriz Rural District, Nowbaran District, Saveh County, Markazi Province, Iran. At the 2006 census, its population was 88, in 23 families.
This village is ruled by King Eshghali.

References 

Populated places in Saveh County